This is a list of significant archaeological expeditions by date, which include first excavations at important sites, or expeditions that uncovered important objects.

1500s
Pompeii - 1599 - Domenico Fontana called when the digging of an underground channel to divert the river Sarno ran into ancient walls covered with paintings and inscriptions.

1600s
Ur - 1625 - Pietro Della Valle noted bricks with cuneiform writing and stone seals at the site of Ur.

1700s
Julliberrie's Grave - 1702 - Heneage Finch

1800s

1810s
Babylon - 1811–12 - Claudius Rich

1840s
Dur-Sharrukin (Knorsabad) - 1842 - Paul-Émile Botta
Ninevah - 1843 - Paul-Émile Botta
Ninevah - 1845 - Austen Henry Layard
Dur-Sharrukin (Knorsabad) - 1847 - Austen Henry Layard found Sennacherib's palace, and the library of Ashurbanipal

1850s
Larsa - 1850 - William Loftus
Nippur - 1851 - Austen Henry Layard
Borsippa - 1854 - Henry Creswicke Rawlinson
Eridu - 1855 - John George Taylor

1870s
Troy - 1871-1879 - Heinrich Schliemann conducted two excavations at the site, determining that the city pre-dated the Classical era

1880s
Sippar - 1880-81 - Hormuzd Rassam
Sippar-Amnanum - Hormuzd Rassam
Tell Zurghul - 1887 - Robert Koldewey
Lagash - 1887 - Robert Koldewey

1890s
Delphi - 1892 - Theophile Homolle, French School of Archaeology

1900s

1900s
Knossos - 1900 - Arthur Evans
Shuruppak - 1902 - Robert Koldewey and Friedrich Delitzsch
Gezer - 1902-09 - R.A.S. Macalister
Adab - 1903-05 - Edgar James Banks
Girsu - 1903-09 - Gaston Cros

1910s
Tell al-'Ubaid - Henry Hall

1920s
 Ngaut Ngaut (also called Devon Downs) - Norman Tindale
Mohenjo-daro - Kashinath Narayan Dikshit in 1924–25 and John Marshall in 1925-26
Jemdet Nasr - Stephen Langdon

1930s
Sutton Hoo - Basil Brown
 Eshnunna - Henri Frankfort
 Khafajah - Henri Frankfort

1940s
Tell Uqair - Seton Lloyd

1960s
Masada - Yigael Yadin
Tel Arad - Yohanan Aharoni

1990s
Marad - 1990 - Excavations led by Na'el Hannoon

2000s
Tulul al-Baqarat - 2008-10 - Ayad Mahir Mahmud

2010s
Tell Khaiber - 2013-17

Excavations by date